(born 1963 in Tochigi Prefecture, Japan) is a Japanese non-fiction writer for murders and a critic for manga. He dropped out of Waseda University. He writes books about Japanese serial or spree killers such as Tsutomu Miyazaki, Sataro Fukiage and Mutsuo Toi.

In March 1993, Hachisu released  with the support of Go Nagai, the author of the manga Devilman. The book covered not the anime adaption of the Devilman but the original manga by Go Nagai.

On November 30, 2000, he released the book "Kyosen no Ikikata" Jissen Manual: Daredemo Dekiru Semi Retire.

His 2003 book Satsujin Genba o Aruku became a subject of reviews such as NHK's Shūkan Book Review and Yomiuri Shimbun.

Works 
 (1990) 
 (1993) 
 (1993) 
 (1995) 
 (1998) 
 (2000) 
 (2003) 
 (2005) 
 (2005) 
 (2006)

References

External links 
 Homepage

Japanese non-fiction writers
1963 births
Living people